Border Towns is guitarist Preston Reed's last recording for MCA Records.

Track listing
(All songs by Preston Reed)
 "Jungle Highway" – 3:31
 "Border Towns" – 3:33
 "Sunrise Drive" – 4:31
 "Signal Path" – 2:31
 "Film Noir" – 3:29
 "Outskirts" – 3:11
 "Portofino" – 3:33
 "Big Fat Frets" – 3:17
 "Dead Cool" – 3:31
 "Hit the Ground Running" – 3:39

Personnel
Preston Reed – guitar
Alex Acuña – drums, percussion
John Pena – Warwick bass and MIDI effects
Otmaro Ruiz – synthesizer

Production notes
Produced by John Pena, Alex Acuna and Preston Reed
Engineered by John Scherf, Tom Mudge, Paul Baron and Brian Springer
Mixed and mastered by Brian Springer

References

1993 albums
Preston Reed albums
MCA Records albums